Al Salamah is a motor yacht which was the property of the former Saudi Arabian Crown Prince, Sultan bin Abdulaziz. In 2013 it was put on sale for US$280 million but later it was given to Bahraini Crown Prince Salman bin Hamad Al Khalifa as a gift. At the time of its construction, it was the third largest motor yacht in the world.

Creation
Al Salamah was ordered to be built, in 1998, by the German shipbuilding company HDW, in Kiel, Germany, but was finished at the Lürssen ship-yard in Bremen. The project carried the name Mipos "Mission possible" despite of the vessel delivery time requests. (Hull number: 13590). The yacht was also the second owned by a member of the Royal Family; their first yacht was the Prince Abdulaziz, which had been built in 1984.

Design
Al Salamah is a private vessel, and is not available for public hire. It is estimated to be worth upwards of $200 million USD. Among the ship's amenities are a cinema, a library, a business center, a fully equipped onboard hospital, two full-time beauticians, a gymnasium, and a spa.

References

1999 ships
Motor yachts